Maaike Polspoel (born 28 March 1989) is a Belgian former road bicycle racer. She competed at the 2012 Summer Olympics in the Women's road race, finishing 29th.

Major results

2008
 3rd Buggenhout-Opstal
 8th Grand Prix de Dottignies
2010
 3rd Sparkassen Giro
2011
 1st Grand Prix Damien Yserbyt
 1st Stage 4 Holland Ladies Tour
 2nd Time trial, Flemish Brabant Provincial Road Championships
 8th GP Ciudad de Valladolid
2012
 1st Boortmeerbeek Criterium
 2nd Maria-Ter-Heide Criterium
 3rd Knokke-Heist-Bredene
 3rd Oostduinkerke Criterium
 3rd Belsele Criterium
 4th Cholet Pays de Loire Dames
2013
 1st Erondegemse Pijl
 National Road Championships
2nd Road race
2nd Time trial
 2nd Gooik–Geraardsbergen–Gooik
 2nd Sparkassen Giro Bochum
2014
 1st Trofee Maarten Wynants
 3rd Time trial, National Road Championships
 5th Overall La Route de France
 5th Le Samyn des Dames
 7th Grand Prix de Dottignies
2015
 3rd  Team road race, Military World Games
 6th Trofee Maarten Wynants

References

External links
 

Belgian female cyclists
1989 births
Living people
Olympic cyclists of Belgium
Cyclists at the 2012 Summer Olympics
People from Vilvoorde
Cyclists from Flemish Brabant
21st-century Belgian women